Bangladesh National Film Award for Best Actor is the highest award for film acting in Bangladesh.

List of winners
Key

Records and statistics

Multiple wins and nominations
The following individuals received two or more Best Actor awards:

See also
 Bangladesh National Film Award for Best Actress
 Bangladesh National Film Award for Best Supporting Actor
 Bangladesh National Film Award for Best Supporting Actress

Notes

References

Sources

 
 
 
 
 
 
 

Actor
National Film Awards (Bangladesh)